Eckel may refer to:

Surname
 Bruce Eckel (author of Thinking in Java and Thinking in C++)
 Horst Eckel (1932–2021), former German football player
 Kyle Eckel, American football player
 Malcolm David Eckel, professor at Boston University

Other
 Eckel Industries, an acoustics noise control company

See also 
 Ekel (disambiguation)
 Eckels, a surname